Civil Service Islamic Society (CSIS) is a British non-political, voluntary society, representative of mainstream Islamic opinion.

Premise
The Civil Service Islamic Society was launched in February 2005. It is a non-political, voluntary society, representative of mainstream Islamic opinion in central government, it is based in the United Kingdom.

The organisation aims to build on common shared inter-faith values for the benefit of the Civil Service. The mission is to raise awareness of Islam, influence areas of interests and empower its Muslim staff by acting as a representative body of mainstream Islamic affairs.

The patron and ambassador of the organisation is Gus O'Donnell and the president of the organisation is Azad Ali.

References

External links

Organizations established in 2005
2005 establishments in the United Kingdom
Islamic organisations based in the United Kingdom
Civil Service (United Kingdom)